Microhyla zeylanica. the Sri Lanka rice frog or Sri Lanka narrow-mouth frog, is a species of frog in the family Microhylidae. It is endemic to Sri Lanka.
Its natural habitats are subtropical or tropical moist montane forests, subtropical or tropical high-altitude grassland, swamps, freshwater marshes, and intermittent freshwater marshes.
It is threatened by habitat loss.

References

zeylanica
Frogs of Sri Lanka
Endemic fauna of Sri Lanka
Taxonomy articles created by Polbot
Amphibians described in 1949